Riegele is a traditional German brewery located in Augsburg, Swabia, Bavaria. 

The Brauhaus Riegele was created in 1884, when Sebastian Riegele Sr. acquired the brewery "Zum Goldenen Ross", which originated in 1386.
In 1911, a new building was built outside the city as well as the construction of the "Riegelehaus" on the Königsplatz.

At the end of the 1980s, the Brauhaus acquired the name rights for the lactic acid-based lemonade "Chabeso".

In 2015 Sierra Nevada Brewing Company partnered with Riegele on Oktoberfest.

See also 
Josef Priller
List of oldest companies

References

External links 
Homepage in German
Facebook page

14th-century establishments in the Holy Roman Empire
Breweries in Germany
Beer brands of Germany
Companies established in the 14th century
Pages translated from German Wikipedia